The bobtail snipe eels are two species of deep-sea eels in the family Cyematidae, one only in each of two genera. They are small elongate fishes, growing up to 16cm (6 in) in length.

The family Cyematidae is characterized by thin, short bodies with long jaws and small teeth and eyes. In addition, they possess the confluent dorsal, caudal, and anal fins in the posterior position. Species were thought to inhabit only the Southern Atlantic, until two new specimens were captured in the Northern Atlantic in 2006 and 2008.

They are bathypelagic (deep-water ocean-dwellers) and have been found down to 5,000 m (16,400 ft). They are found in all oceans and do not undergo vertical diurnal migration.

See also
List of fish families

References

 
 

Cyematidae
Deep sea fish